Our Endless War is the fifth studio album by American deathcore band Whitechapel. The album was released on April 29, 2014, via Metal Blade.

The song "The Saw Is the Law" was released on February 26, 2014, as the first single off the album. On April 15, 2014, a lyric video for the song "Our Endless War" was released.

Reception
The album debuted on Billboard 200 at No. 10, No. 2 on Top Rock Albums, and No. 1 on the Hard Rock Albums chart, selling 16,270 copies in its first week.  The album has sold 45,000 copies in the United States as of June 2016. It remains the band's highest-charting album.

Track listing

Deluxe Edition

Credits 
Production and performance credits are adapted from the album liner notes.

Personnel 
Whitechapel
 Phil Bozeman – vocals
 Ben Savage (Eller) – lead guitar
 Alex Wade – rhythm guitar
 Zach Householder – third guitar
 Gabe Crisp – bass
 Ben Harclerode – drums

Additional musicians
 Ben Eller – guitar solo on "The Saw Is the Law", "Psychopathy", "Blacked Out", "Diggs Road", "A Process So Familiar"

Production
 Mark Lewis – production, engineering, mixing
 Whitechapel – production
 Eyal Levi – drum assistant, digital editing
 Matt Brown – drum tech
 Ted Jensen – mastering

Artwork and design
 Aaron Marsh – artwork
 Whitechapel – art direction

Studios 
 Audiohammer, Sanford, FL, US – recording (drums), mixing
 Wade Studios, Louisville, TN, US – recording (guitars, bass, vocals)
 Sterling Sound, New York City, NY, US – mastering

Charts

References

External links 
 
 Our Endless War at Metal Blade
 Our Endless War at Whitechapel's official website

2014 albums
Albums produced by Mark Lewis (music producer)
Metal Blade Records albums
Whitechapel (band) albums